WBLG-LP (107.9 FM) was a radio station licensed to serve Bowling Green, Kentucky, United States. The station was owned by Meadowland Baptist Church.

On February 16, 2012, the station's license was cancelled and its callsign deleted by the Federal Communications Commission per the licensee's request.

References

External links
 

Defunct religious radio stations in the United States
BLG-LP
BLG-LP
Radio stations disestablished in 2012
Defunct radio stations in the United States
2012 disestablishments in Kentucky
BLG-LP